Rhododendron russatum, the purplish-blue rhododendron, is a species of flowering plant in the genus Rhododendron native to south-central China and Myanmar. It has gained the Royal Horticultural Society's Award of Garden Merit.

References

russatum
Plants described in 1919